Coenostolopsis is a genus of moths of the family Crambidae.

Species
Coenostolopsis apicalis (Lederer, 1863)
Coenostolopsis selenophora (Hampson, 1912)
Coenostolopsis terminalis Munroe, 1960

References

Spilomelinae
Crambidae genera
Taxa named by Eugene G. Munroe